Cheye Christian Alexander (born 6 January 1995) is an English professional footballer who plays as a right-back for  club Gillingham.

A former West Ham United Academy graduate, he spent the 2013–14 season with Port Vale, though only played first-team games during a loan spell at Ilkeston. He had brief spells with Concord Rangers and Bishop's Stortford before joining Aldershot Town, initially on a non-contract basis, in March 2015. He remained with the club for just over three seasons, playing 146 games in league and cup competitions. He was signed by Barnet in June 2018 and spent two seasons with the club before he returned to the English Football League following a six-year absence after signing with AFC Wimbledon. He spent two seasons with Wimbledon and then signed with Gillingham in July 2022.

Club career

Early career
Born in Newham, Alexander supported his local team West Ham United as a child and joined their academy in 2003, remaining there for ten years before being released as an 18-year old in summer 2013. He was diagnosed with Osgood–Schlatter disease, which causes knee pain but gave him a growth spurt during his last year as a schoolboy. This meant that he had to play through the pain during the 2011–12 season, and though he managed to join the under-18 team during the 2012–13 season he was not given a professional contract by the club. He instead signed a one-year deal with Port Vale, but did not make any first team appearances for the "Valiants". On 13 December 2013, he joined Northern Premier League Premier Division side Ilkeston on a one-month loan deal. Vale manager Micky Adams confirmed that Alexander would not be offered a new contract in April 2014.

On 5 September 2014, he signed with Conference South side Concord Rangers. He made his debut for the club in a 2–0 win over Weston-super-Mare on 1 November and played a total of three games for the "Beach Boys". On 28 November 2014, he joined fellow Conference South club Bishop's Stortford. He played two games for the "Blues", one each in the league and FA Trophy.

Aldershot Town
Alexander joined Aldershot Town on a non-contract basis on 3 March 2015. He made his club debut in a 1–1 draw with Braintree Town on 11 April and played three further Conference Premier games by the end of the 2014–15 season. He signed a one-year contract with the "Shots" in June 2015. Manager Barry Smith said that "he's got all of the attributes of a full-back and he’ll play in the style that I want to play".

He scored his first career goal on 22 August 2015, in a 4–0 win at Guiseley. He scored two goals in 50 appearances across the 2015–16 campaign. He signed a new one-year contract in June 2016, with manager Gary Waddock commenting that he felt he could improve the player further. He made 45 appearances during the 2016–17 season, scoring one goal, as Aldershot qualified for the play-offs with a fifth-place finish. However they were beaten 5–2 on aggregate by Tranmere Rovers in the play-off semi-finals.

On 19 August 2017, he scored from 25-yards out at Boreham Wood but claimed it meant nothing to him as the team lost the game 2–1. He ended the 2017–18 season with two goals in 45 games, with Aldershot again claiming a play-off spot with a fifth-place finish. However this time they lost a penalty shoot-out to Ebbsfleet United after their play-off quarter-final game ended in a 1–1 draw at the Recreation Ground. He was released by his own request in May 2018. Upon his departure from the club he said that  "I feel I have improved as a player and I’ve learned so much at Aldershot.... it's an amazing club that’s become a big part of my life".

Barnet
On 26 June 2018, Alexander joined Barnet on a two-year contract for an undisclosed fee, with "Bees" manager John Still admitting that he had tried to sign the player on previous occasions. He scored two goals from 53 appearances during the 2018–19 campaign as Barnet posted a 12th-place finish in the National League. He scored two goals in 42 games during the 2019–20 season, which was ended early due to the COVID-19 pandemic in England, with Barnet in the play-offs with a seventh-place finish. He turned down a short-term contract extension in June 2020 that would have kept him at The Hive Stadium for the delayed play-off campaign after informing manager Darren Currie that he had found a move to a club in the English Football League.

AFC Wimbledon
On 23 July 2020, he returned to the Football League by signing for League One club AFC Wimbledon. Manager Glyn Hodges said that he had impressed the club's scouts and that he hoped to have found a "hidden gem in non league" as they found with left-back Nesta Guinness-Walker the previous year. He made his debut on 5 September, when he started an EFL Cup tie away at Oxford United. However it was only when Mark Robinson succeeded Hodges as manager the following January that Alexander enjoyed a sustained run in the first-team. He made a total of 36 appearances in the 2020–21 season, helping the "Dons" to post a 19th-place finish in League One. He featured 25 times in the 2021–22 relegation campaign, but was unable to play for incoming manager Mark Bowen after missing the end of the season with a groin injury. He was released in June 2022.

Gillingham
Alexander signed for League Two side Gillingham on 15 July 2022 after impressing manager Neil Harris whilst on trial. He made his debut for the Kent side as a 67th-minute substitute on the opening day of the 2022–23 season, in a 2–0 away loss to the team who had just released him, AFC Wimbledon. His first Gillingham goal came in the return fixture at Priestfield in February 2023, with his deflected volley sealing a 2–1 victory over his former employers.

International career
Alexander played one game for the England C team, coming on as a substitute in an away win against Estonia U23 on 15 November 2016.

Personal life
In 2016 Alexander set up his own brand, Christian Rose, combining his name with that of his younger sister 'Rose'.

Career statistics

References

1995 births
Living people
Footballers from Forest Gate
Black British sportspeople
English footballers
England semi-pro international footballers
Association football fullbacks
West Ham United F.C. players
Port Vale F.C. players
Ilkeston F.C. players
Concord Rangers F.C. players
Bishop's Stortford F.C. players
Aldershot Town F.C. players
Barnet F.C. players
AFC Wimbledon players
Gillingham F.C. players
Northern Premier League players
National League (English football) players
English Football League players